Petulanos is a genus of headstander from South America.  There are currently three described species; one each in the Xingu, Nickerie and Essequibo river basins.

Species
 Petulanos intermedius (R. Winterbottom, 1980)
 Petulanos plicatus (C. H. Eigenmann, 1912)
 Petulanos spiloclistron (R. Winterbottom, 1974)

References
 

Anostomidae
Taxa named by Richard Peter Vari
Fish of South America